Galina Sergeyevna Kreft-Alekseyeva (14 March 1950 – 24 February 2005) was a Soviet sprint canoer who competed from the mid-1970s to the early 1980s. Competing in two Summer Olympics, she won two medals in the K-2 500 m: a gold in 1976 and a silver in 1980.

Kreft also won seven silver medals at the ICF Canoe Sprint World Championships with two in the K-1 500 m (1975, 1979), one in the K-2 500 m (1975), and four in the K-4 500 m events (1974, 1975, 1979, 1983).

References

1950 births
2005 deaths
Canoeists at the 1976 Summer Olympics
Canoeists at the 1980 Summer Olympics
Olympic canoeists of the Soviet Union
Olympic gold medalists for the Soviet Union
Olympic silver medalists for the Soviet Union
Russian female canoeists
Soviet female canoeists
Olympic medalists in canoeing
ICF Canoe Sprint World Championships medalists in kayak

Medalists at the 1980 Summer Olympics
Medalists at the 1976 Summer Olympics